Rockettes may refer to:

 The Rockettes, a New York dance company famous for their kickline and eye-high kicks
 Rockettes (synchronized skating team), a Finnish synchronized ice skating team
 Rockette Morton (born 1949), U.S. musician

See also 
 Can-can, a music hall dance
 Rocket (disambiguation)
 Rockett (disambiguation)
 Roquette (disambiguation)